Sangamon Township is a township in Piatt County, Illinois, USA.  As of the 2010 census, its population was 2,357 and it contained 929 housing units.

Geography
Lakes in this township include Buck Pond (historical). The stream of Madden Creek runs through this township.

Cities and towns
 Monticello (northeast three-quarters)

Unincorporated towns
 Galesville
 Lodge
 White Heath

Extinct towns
 Centerville

Adjacent townships
 Blue Ridge Township (north)
 Mahomet Township, Champaign County (northeast)
 Scott Township, Champaign County (east)
 Colfax Township, Champaign County (southeast)
 Monticello Township (south)
 Goose Creek Township (west)

Cemeteries
The township contains nine cemeteries: Argo, Boyer, Bucks Pond, Camp Creek, Hughes, Ingram, Mackey, Madden and Mallory.

Major highways
  Interstate 72
  Illinois State Route 10

Airports and landing strips
 Clapper Airport

Demographics

References
 U.S. Board on Geographic Names (GNIS)
 United States Census Bureau cartographic boundary files

External links
 
 US-Counties.com
 City-Data.com
 Illinois State Archives

Townships in Piatt County, Illinois
1859 establishments in Illinois
Populated places established in 1859
Townships in Illinois